Joe Glick (1903-1978) was an American boxer from Brooklyn who established himself early as a top contender among junior lightweights. He had two Junior Lightweight Title shots against Tod Morgan in 1926–27, but was unable to take the championship. Moving up in weight class, he also excelled as a Lightweight. His long career spanned twenty-three years and included over two hundred verified bouts.

Early boxing career 
Joe Glick was born in the Williamsburg area of Brooklyn, on February 22, 1903 and began training as a boxer in his teens. He worked as a tailor prior to his boxing career.

Barely eighteen in 1921, he won nine of his first eleven fights in the Brooklyn area, showing exceptional promise at an early age. Six of his first eleven wins were won by knockout. He lost only two of his better publicized fights in 1922, setting an exceptional early fight record. On January 26, 1923, he was knocked out by Petey Hayes at the 9th Coast Defense Armory in New York, but did not incur another loss until June 9, 1923 against Jimmy Hutchinson.  He had only two additional losses in 1923, as the quality of his competition continued to steadily improve.

Boxing career as jr. lightweight contender and top lightweight 
At 23, in a ten-round bout on January 29, 1926, Glick defeated Johnny Dundee, the former 1923 Featherweight and Junior Lightweight champion who was nearing the end of an exceptional career. According to the Milwaukee Sentinel, the rising Glick was a 2–1 favorite against Dundee, who, despite his reputation, had been retired from the ring for six months prior to his bout with Glick. Partly as a result of this win, Glick was matched with Tod Morgan, Junior Lightweight Champion on September 30 of that year and was decisively defeated in his first fifteen-round title shot in Madison Square Garden. According to the Associated Press, Glick took only one round of the fifteen-round match.

Close match with Jr. Lightweight Champion Tod Morgan
In a second World Junior Lightweight Title on December 16, 1927, Glick fared better against Morgan in a controversial match. Glick lost the bout as a result of punching Morgan below the belt in the fourteenth round. At least one source, Oregon's Bend Bulletin wrote that for each of the three times Morgan was down on the canvas, "it was from a questionable body blow which was struck near the foul line." The Bulletin also noted that the "9000 fans started yelling low blow as early as the second round".   Glick dropped Morgan for nine counts once in the second and twice in the fifth, and may have won the bout had he not been disqualified for a low left to the groin in the fourteenth by referee Eddie Forbes. Morgan was hurt by loops to the head, often to the jaw, and digs to the body at several points in the bout. Glick began the first with a strong and effective attack against Morgan. Glick was first warned of a low blow in the third round, and had lost previous fights to low blows. Though he was ahead on points prior to the foul, Glick subsequently lost his second chance at the Junior Lightweight title. He would never get a third opportunity.

In between these two bouts with Morgan between January 1926 and December 1927, Glick stayed busy fighting exceptional boxers including Benny Bass and Jack Bernstein.  Future Boxing Hall of Fame recipient Bass would at one time hold both the World Jr. Lightweight and Featherweight Title. Bernstein had briefly taken the World Jr. Lightweight Title on May 30, 1923 at the Coney Island Velodrome against Johnny Dundee. Glick was unable to beat Bass in his three meetings, but did obtain one no decision.  Shortly before his second bout with Morgan, he defeated Bernstein in a widely attended ten-round match on November 14, 1927 at Madison Square Garden.

Brief boxing suspension and bout with Baby Joe Gans
Oddly, Glick was suspended for a full year from boxing by the Philadelphia Boxing Commission for stalling during his bout with Al Gordon in Philadelphia on February 13, 1928.  The suspension applied only to Philadelphia, and Glick fought extensively in New York and New Jersey the remainder of the year, meeting elite lightweights. On November 16, 1928, in one of his most well attended bouts, Glick met Baby Joe Gans in Madison Square Garden in New York before a crowd of nearly 19,000. The United Press expressed distaste in the quality of the match, though the local New York Times was quite impressed with the quality of Glick's fighting, and the crowd ardently supported the ten round points decision in favor of Glick, the New York native.

After the zenith of his early career as a Junior Lightweight in January 1929, Tex Ricard, manager for Jack Dempsey, still rated Glick third among top Lightweights in America.

Exciting bouts with Champions Jimmy McLarnin, Kid Kaplan, Jack "Kid" Berg, and Tony Canzoneri
In January and March 1929, Glick faced the exceptional Jimmy McLarnin, a former Lightweight champion, but lost to him in both bouts. Glick's first bout with McLarnin in Madison Square Garden on January 11, garnered large attendance, and though Glick lost the ten round bout by unanimous decision, McLarnin's nose was broken in the bout. His second bout with McLarnin in the Garden on March 1, attended by nearly 19,000, ended when Glick was knocked out in the second round.

Glick also lost to Louis "Kid Kaplan," former Featherweight champion, in April 1929.  In 1930, Glick fought Tony Canzoneri, former World Featherweight champion, and hall of famer Jackie "Kid" Berg, Featherweight World Champion from 1930 to 1931. Canzoneri beat Glick in a ten-round decision, taking the lightweight title later that year.  Berg would defeat Glick in two decisions that year.

By 1933, Glick's career began to wane, and though he continued to box talented boxers, he lost a number of his bouts, with some by knockout. In 1933–35, he lost twelve well publicized bouts. On September 1, 1934, he was knocked out by Ceferino Garcia, a 1939 World Middleweight champion in only the second round of a ten-round match in Pismo Beach, California. On October 26, 1934, he was knocked out in less than a minute by Freddie Steele in Yakima, Washington. During this period, Glick had begun to appear as a movie extra in the Los Angeles area.

Movie career after professional boxing 
Near the end of his professional boxing career around 1933, Glick moved to Los Angeles and appeared in a number of films, primarily as an extra, often appearing in the movie's credits.
In 1933, Glick appeared briefly on screen in 20th Century Pictures' The Bowery. In this rough slice-of-life movie set in the New York Bowery in the East end of Manhattan in the 1890s, several of the characters played thugs or boxers. The film starred actors Wallace Beery and Fay Ray, and Glick appeared with ex-Middleweight World Champion Al McCoy, as well as boxers Jim Flynn, Phil Bloom, Frank Moran, British boxer William Thomas, known as "Kid Broad," Jack Herrick and Abe Hollandersky. The boxing extras were well cast. Bloom, Flynn, Moran, and Hollandersky had all boxed frequently in New York, and several had lived there.

Glick also appeared briefly in the 1933 Paramount Productions's, Tillie and Gus, an adventure film about the purchase of a ferry boat, the Fairy Queen.

Another rough slice-of-life movie in which Glick appeared was the black and white 1934 Paramount Productions's film, LimeHouse Blues. Not atypical of the movies in which ex-boxers found roles, the film depicted rough street life.  It was set in London's LimeHouse Causeway, a riverfront slum, and the main character, Harry Young ran a smuggling business out of his club.

In 1938, Glick played an extra in MGM's The Crowd Roars. In this successful boxing movie with Robert Taylor as the lead, Glick briefly appeared in a background gymnasium scene with boxers Larry Williams, Maxie Rosenbloom, Jimmy McLarnin, Abie Bain, Frankie Grandetta, Jack Roper, Tommy Herman, Larry Williams, and Abe "The Newsboy" Hollandersky.

Glick also played a small role in Imperial Pictures', May 1957 release of Monkey on My Back, which often included the subtitle The Barney Ross Story.  Loosely based on the life of Lightweight, Junior Welterweight, and Welterweight boxing Champion Barney Ross, the film cast Ross as the character Cameron Mitchell in a major role.  His real life cornerman Art Winch was played by Richard Benedict.  Boxers appearing in the movie included Ceferina Garcia, who both Ross and Glick had boxed with painful results, Joe La Barba, and Tommy Herman. Though the only film ever made about the triple world title holder and recipient of the Silver star, it was a disappointment to Ross and his family who felt it sensationalized Ross's drug addiction.

Glick died on September 5, 1978 in Woodland Hills, a suburb of Los Angeles, California.

Professional boxing record
All information in this section is derived from BoxRec, unless otherwise stated.

Official record

All newspaper decisions are officially regarded as "no decision" bouts and are not counted in the win/loss/draw column.

Unofficial record

Record with the inclusion of newspaper decisions in the win/loss/draw column.

References

External links 
 

1978 deaths
Boxers from New York City
Lightweight boxers
1903 births
American male boxers
Sportspeople from Brooklyn
Jewish American boxers
Jewish boxers
20th-century American Jews